Nima Shabannejad (also Romanized as Nima Sha'ban Nejad, born May 11, 1987) is an Iranian actor who is well known for playing in comedy movies and series, including The Monster, Dracula, and Khandevane.

He played various roles in Khandevane TV show for many years and became famous in this way.

Education Background 
He received a bachelor's degree in theatre directing in 2008 from University of Tehran.

Filmography

Television series

Variety shows 
 Khandevane (2014 – present), directed by Rambod Javan

Film 
 2018 - Future
 2019 - Turquz Abad
 2020 - On Rails Edge
 2020 - After the Incident
 2021 - A Poetess (Short film)
 2021 - Glass house

Theatre

As an actor 
 Glass Garden and Zoo - 2006
 Mir Nowruz - 2009
 Battle and Medea - 2010
 Labirent - 2013
 A Skull in Connemara - 2013
 Dragon rage - 2015
 Wrong arrangement - 2016
 Dribble - 2017

As a director 
 Ignorant Chef - 2005
 Prisoner No. 3 from the United States - 2007
 Garbage bin neighbor - 2008 and 2010
 Freedom in the Dead End - 2010
 Four seasons like each other - 2010
 Plus-Plus to the power of two - 2022

References

External links
 
 Nima Shabannejad at peliplat

Iranian comedians
Iranian film directors
Male actors from Tehran
Iranian male stage actors
Iranian male television actors
University of Tehran alumni
Iranian male film actors
Living people
1987 births